Urophora kasachstanica is a species of tephritid or fruit flies in the genus Urophora of the family Tephritidae.

Distribution
Ukraine, Kazakhstan, Uzbekistan, Tadzhikistan

References

Urophora
Insects described in 1964
Diptera of Europe
Diptera of Asia